Billstown (also Bills Town, Bills) is an unincorporated community in Pike County, Arkansas, United States. Billstown is located on Arkansas Highway 301 near the Little Missouri River. First settled in 1858, Billstown has active timber and some cattle farming.

Education
It is in the South Pike County School District.

It was previously in the Delight School District. On July 1, 2010, the Delight district merged with the Murfreesboro district to form the South Pike County School District. Before World War 2, Billstown supported a small elementary school at the Billstown Cemetery.

Notable people
Glen Campbell (1936-2017), singer, actor, and entertainer, was born in Billstown and buried in the Campbell family cemetery in Billstown.
Rep. Alvis W. Stokes (1907-1986) born in Billstown, served in the state legislature in 1959 and 1961, as well as judge for Pike County. An active poultry and cattle farmer, he also served on the board of the Bank of Delight. Prior to World War 2, he owned and operated a nursery and produced sorghum molasses under the business name W.R. Stokes & Son. He is buried with his wife Clarice E. Stokes, teacher and homemaker, in Delight, Arkansas.

References

Unincorporated communities in Pike County, Arkansas
Unincorporated communities in Arkansas
Glen Campbell